Ewan Roy Urain Aird (born 10 March 2000) is a professional footballer who plays as a forward for SD Amorebieta, on loan from Bilbao Athletic. Born in Spain, he represented Scotland at under-21 level.

Background
Urain was born in Durango in the Basque region. His mother Diane grew up in Dumfriesshire, taught English abroad and met her Biscayan husband in Spain.

Club career 
After a spell with hometown side SCD Durango, he joined Athletic Bilbao in 2015. He turned out for the club at under-16 and under-17 level before hitting 19 goals for the under-18 side. In 2018 he scored 13 goals for the club's farm team CD Basconia, based in Basauri.

He began to feature regularly for the B team in the 2020–21 season (though interrupted by injuries) as the side reached the play-offs for promotion to the second division, but lost in the last round.

Having missed parts of the 2021–22 Primera Federación campaign with injuries and been used mainly as a late substitute when he was available, which continued at the start of 2022–23, in December 2022 he moved on loan to SD Amorebieta, playing at the same level as Bilbao Athletic, for the remainder of that season.

International career 
Urain was called up by Scotland Under-21s in 2021 for matches with Northern Ireland.

Style of play 
Urain has been described as an old-fashioned striker making use of his height and strength, and has been compared with former Athletic Bilbao player Fernando Llorente.

References

External links 
 
 
 
 

2000 births
Living people
People from Durango, Biscay
Footballers from the Basque Country (autonomous community)
Sportspeople from Biscay
Scottish footballers
Scotland under-21 international footballers
Spanish footballers
Scottish people of Spanish descent
Spanish people of Scottish descent
Association football forwards
Primera Federación players
Segunda División B players
Tercera División players
CD Basconia footballers
Bilbao Athletic footballers
SD Amorebieta footballers